John Knauer House and Mill, also known as Knauer Mill, is a historic grist mill complex located in Warwick Township, Chester County, Pennsylvania. The site is located in the Hopewell Big Woods.  The complex was built between about 1785 and 1790, and includes the stone mill, -story stone miller's house, a stone and frame barn, and a small stone house.  The miller's house is five bays by two bays, and is in the Georgian style.  The mill remained in operation into the 1940s.

It was added to the National Register of Historic Places in 1985.

References

External links
Gristmill, video of this mill by Wanda Kaluza

Grinding mills on the National Register of Historic Places in Pennsylvania
Houses on the National Register of Historic Places in Pennsylvania
Georgian architecture in Pennsylvania
Industrial buildings completed in 1790
Houses in Chester County, Pennsylvania
Houses completed in 1790
Grinding mills in Chester County, Pennsylvania
1790 establishments in Pennsylvania
National Register of Historic Places in Chester County, Pennsylvania